The Greek Super Cup, officially known as the Cup of Friendship and Solidarity was a Greek association football one-match competition which was contested annually by the Super League champion club and the winners of the Greek Cup.

The first match took place in 1980 at the Karaiskakis Stadium in Piraeus. Then and until 1994, matches were played at Olympic Stadium, while in 1996 and 2007 they were played at Karaiskakis Stadium.

History

Edition by PSAT

The 1980 match was organized by the Union of Sport Press.

Editions by HFF

Performance by club
Note: winning years are marked with bold.

Matches

References

Sources
 Greece - List of Super Cup Finals, Spyros Karasoulos-Alexander Mastrogiannopoulos, Rec.Sport.Soccer Statistics Foundation RSSSF (The first event took place in season's 1979-80  between Olympiacos-Kastoria, champions and cup winners respectively)

Bibliography
The book Legend: a course through time (Heliotropio Publications, 1997) mentions as the first Super Cup that of 1980: "In 1980 the first organization of the" Super Cup "took place, ..." (p. 245)

Super Cup
Greece
1980 establishments in Greece
Recurring sporting events established in 1980